The 3rd Grand Prix de Paris was a Formula One motor race held on 24 April 1949 at the Autodrome de Linas-Montlhéry, in Montlhéry near Paris, France.

The 50-lap race was won by Talbot-Lago driver Philippe Étancelin. Yves Giraud-Cabantous and Georges Grignard shared another Talbot-Lago for second place and Johnny Claes was third in a Maserati. Louis Rosier set fastest lap in a Talbot-Lago but failed to finish.

Results

References

Paris